Leptolalax isos is a species of frogs in the family Megophryidae.

References

isos
Amphibians described in 2015